Zamarra is a municipality in the province of Salamanca,  western Spain, part of the autonomous community of Castile-Leon. It is located 100 kilometres from the city of Salamanca and as of 2016 has a population of 105 people. The municipality covers an area of 48 km².

The village lies 778 metres above sea level and the postal code is 37591.

References

Municipalities in the Province of Salamanca